James Scudamore may refer to:

James Scudamore (courtier) (1568–1619), courtier to Queen Elizabeth I and Custos Rotulorum of Herefordshire, 1616–1619
James Scudamore (died 1668) (1624–1668), English Member of Parliament for Hereford, 1642–1643, and Herefordshire, 1661–1668
James Scudamore, 3rd Viscount Scudamore (1684–1716), MP for Herefordshire, 1705–1715, and Hereford, 1715–1716
James Scudamore (veterinary surgeon), former Chief Veterinary Officer for the United Kingdom
James Scudamore (author) (born 1976), British author

See also
James Skidmore (disambiguation)